Edward Peck Knowles (April 13, 1805 – October 16, 1881): Mayor of Providence, Rhode Island for one term, 1854–1855.

Early life
Edward Knowles was born April 13, 1805 in Providence, Rhode Island. His schooling opportunities have been described as "limited". In his youth he worked in a wool factory.

Business career
Knowles was involved in several businesses. He sold jewelry, including clocks and watches, until 1842. Later, he became director of the Fifth National Bank of Providence, president of the Butler Insurance Company, and president of the Mechanics Association.

Political career
He held a number of local offices including common council, alderman, school committee, and General Assembly. He was appointed acting mayor several times, and finally mayor in 1854. As mayor he took an active part in suppressing the Dorr Rebellion. His main political interests appear to be his support of education, particularly evening schools, and temperance.

Personal life
Knowles was widowed several times and had a total of three wives. He married Mary F. Fry in 1827; Alice S. Randall in 1860; and Elizabeth H. Crowell in 1872.

References

External links
 Knowles at Providence City website
 

1881 deaths
1805 births
Mayors of Providence, Rhode Island
Burials at Swan Point Cemetery
Rhode Island Whigs
19th-century American politicians